The 2015 Afghan Premier League is the fourth season of Afghan Premier League, the Afghan league for association football clubs, since its establishment in 2012. Shaheen Asmayee F.C. are the defending champions of the Premier League. The season started on 27 August 2015 with the 8 teams again in two groups. Shaheen Asmayee again reached the final of the Afghan Premier League and faced off against De Spin Ghar Bazan F.C. It was the first time De Spin Ghar reached the final of the league.

Teams
Shaheen Asmayee F.C. (Falcon of Asmayee), Greater Kabul Region.
Toofaan Harirod F.C. (Harirood Storm), Western region.
Simorgh Alborz F.C. (Alborz Phoenix), North Western region.
Oqaban Hindukush F.C. (Hindukush Eagles), Central region
Mawjhai Amu F.C. (Amu Waves), North Eastern region.
De Maiwand Atalan F.C. (Maiwand Champions), Southern region.
De Spin Ghar Bazan F.C. (Spin Ghar Goshawk), Eastern region.
De Abasin Sape F.C. (Abasin Waves), South Eastern region.

Group stage

Group A

Group B

Semi finals

Consolation (third place)

Final

Statistics

Final standing
→ At the gates, and points to the final round is involved, victory on penalties are a draw.

Top scorers
As of 19 September 2015.

Hat-tricks

TV Rights
All matches of the APL are aired live by two private channels in Afghanistan, namely Tolo TV and Lemar TV. Arman FM and Arakozia FM offer live commentary of the match through the country. Matches are also available live on the world's largest video sharing website YouTube on the league's official YouTube page.

Sponsors
Roshan Telecom is the title sponsor of Afghan Premier League after which it is named as Roshan Afghan Premier League. Official Partners of Afghan Premier League are Afghanistan International Bank and Hummel International which provided kit for the teams.

References

Afghan Premier League seasons
Afghan
2015 in Afghan football